Jorge Ben is the sixth studio album by Brazilian singer-songwriter and guitarist Jorge Ben. It was released in November 1969 by Philips Records. The album was his first recording for a major label since 1965 when his first stint with Philips ended due to creative differences.

Ben recorded the album alongside producer Manoel Barenbein, the vocal/percussion band Trio Mocotó, and an orchestral section arranged by José Briamonte and Rogério Duprat. It was written by Ben during his previous few years performing independently and developing his unique samba-based style. He incorporated psychedelic and soul music for this lively recording, while his quirky lyrics dealt with everyday life, romances with women, Afro-Brazilian identity, and self-awareness. Guido Alberi's iconic cover for the album also drew on psychedelic influences in its pop-art illustration of Ben and symbols of contemporary Brazilian culture.

Jorge Ben was a commercial comeback for Ben and featured several hit songs, including two of his most famous recordings "Que Pena" and "País Tropical". Critics have since associated the album with Brazil's samba rock and Tropicália musical movements. In 2008, it was released for the first time in the United States by Dusty Groove America.

Background 

Jorge Ben began his professional recording career with Philips Records in 1963, when they released his debut album Samba Esquema Novo to immediate fan frenzy. In an effort to capitalize on the success, the label pressured Ben to hastily record follow-up albums of music in the same vein and cover songs as filler. The result was three albums within the span of 18 months and a strain on his relationship with Philips, which ended after the last of these albums (1965's Big Ben) was finished.

For the next few years, Ben performed as an independent artist. His only album during this period, O Bidú: Silêncio no Brooklin, was released in 1967 on the São Paulo-based, small-market label Artistas Unidos and sold poorly. While continuing to refine his idiosyncratic samba-based style, he occasionally recorded singles for Artistas Unidos and wrote songs, some of which were recorded by mainstream acts such as Os Mutantes, Wilson Simonal, and Elis Regina. This caught the interest of Philips, which was under the new leadership of former Odeon Records executive André Midani. In early 1969, Midani re-signed Ben after musicians Gilberto Gil and Caetano Veloso promised to promote him whenever possible.

Recording and production 
Jorge Ben was recorded at C.B.D. in Rio de Janeiro and Scatena in São Paulo. For the album, Ben chose songs he had been working on since the previous year or two. In the studio, he was accompanied on several performances by Trio Mocotó, a vocal/percussion group he had met while touring São Paulo's nightclub circuit in the late 1960s. Philips Records enlisted pianist José Briamonte to arrange an orchestral section for the majority of the songs, with the arrangements for only "Barbarella" and "Descobri que Eu Sou um Anjo" done by Rogério Duprat. According to Verve Records, the album was produced with sound effects that were "state of the art" at the time.

Musical style 

The album's music is defined by what Brazilian music aficionado Greg Caz called a "patented hard-strummed 4/4 samba groove" that soon "inspired a whole underground movement known as samba-rock" and characterized Ben's recordings for the next decade. Music critic Rodney Taylor identified the main elements of his lively samba-rock synthesis to be Trio Mocotó's accompaniment and the string arrangements of Briamonte and Duprat, resulting in "the kind of tropical psychedelia" attempted by contemporaries Gil, Veloso, and Os Mutantes. Commenting on individual tracks, he compared "Descobri que Eu Sou um Anjo" to a "hard-rocking outtake" from the 1967 Love album Forever Changes and said that "Take It Easy My Brother Charles" incorporates funk to the overall sound.

According to AllMusic's Thom Jurek, Briamonte and Duprat's arrangements on the album are essential to Ben's fusion of American soul music with the samba and Brazilian folk song structures from his past work. The website's Alvaro Neder adds that this album and Ben's follow-up Fôrça Bruta (1970) represent his involvement in Brazil's Tropicália cultural and musical movement.

Lyrics and themes 
Thematically, the album explores romances with women and everyday Brazilian life, including football fandom. In "País Tropical", he sings, "I live in a tropical country ... I'm Flamengo and I have a nega [black woman] named Tereza." His lyrics are often characterized by zany reflections, repetition, and nonsense words. As Caz described, "for Jorge, it's not so much about the meaning of the words as it is about their sound. Instead of writing 20 lines, Jorge often preferred to write two that sound very cool and repeat them ten times."

Some songs reflect a burgeoning self-awareness in Ben's songwriting. According to Robert Leaver of Amoeba Music's international records department, the album "asserted Ben's identity with the confidence and exuberance of one who is comfortable in his own skin", particularly in its exploration of Afro-Brazilian perspectives. "Crioula" portrays a black street-market worker who transcends her social status when she performs as a Carnival Queen during Brazilian Carnivals; she is described as "a child of African nobles / who by geographic mistake / was born in Brazil on carnival day." Its final verse quotes text from the back cover of Gil's 1968 self-titled album praising black female beauty: "And as the poet Gil once said / black is the sum of all the colors / you black woman are colorful by nature."

Jorge Ben is strongly informed by African-American soul music's "ethos of racial pride, self-determination, and collective struggle", according to Brazilian culture scholar Christopher Dunn, who cited "Take It Easy My Brother Charles" as a prime example. Ben offers partly English-language words of caution to his "brother of color" in the song, which Caz said expresses a contemporary ethos in an unconventional manner. According to one translation of its Portuguese-language verse, Ben sings:

The character of "Charles" is revisited on "Charles Anjo 45", one of several songs on the album that make allusions to the favelas of Brazil's poor non-white population. In the song, he is depicted as an underworld criminal figure from a Rio favela ("Robin Hood of the ghetto"). The narrative follows his melancholic departure for prison and his celebrated return to the neighborhood.

Packaging 

The album cover was designed by Brazilian artist Guido Alberi. It is a cartoon illustration of Ben surrounded by a psychedelic collage of tropical plants, samba musicians, superhuman women, and the flag of Brazil. Ben is pictured with broken manacles around his wrists, a toucan resting on his bare shoulder, and an acoustic guitar in hand. The guitar is decorated with the logo of Clube de Regatas do Flamengo, Ben's favorite football team. Caz has described Alberi's artwork as "an iconic psychedelic Tropicalia-style cover painting", while art designer Pablo Yglesias said it "remains the favorite cover" for many listeners of música popular brasileira (MPB).

According to Yglesias, either Ben or Alberi had drawn inspiration from Rio de Janeiro's Neorealist art scene (Neorealismo Carioca), which abandoned the high art values of modernism in favor of a focus on ordinary urban life and experimentation with popular, mass-produced mediums such as newspaper photography, graphic design, and comics. As a "magical realist portrait", the cover "mingles the important issues of the day, personal emblems, and symbols of his black Brazilian identity while employing decidedly uptempo pop illustration", he said. "Ben's 'colorless' features contrast remarkably with the day-glo rain-forest world surrounding him, reminding one of the arduous road to self-understanding and realiziation of racial equality." The broken manacles also echo this theme for Yglesias, who said they represent the struggles faced by black people in Brazil and elsewhere in the world.

For the back cover, liner notes expressing approval of Ben were written by Philips producer Armando Pittigliani. Pittigliani had signed and later dropped Ben during the singer's first stint with the label.

Release and reception 

Jorge Ben was released on LP in November 1969 by Philips Records, and became Ben's commercial comeback. In the months leading up to the album's release, several of its songs had become hit songs for other recording artists, including Wilson Simonal ("País Tropical"), Os Originais Do Samba ("Cadê Tereza"), and, as a duo, Caetano Veloso and Gal Costa ("Que Pena"). These songs later became commercial successes for Ben when released as singles from this album. "País Tropical" and "Que Pena" in particular have remained among his most famous songs. According to Leaver, Jorge Ben became Ben's "most significant and commercially successful album to date".

The album was released at the height of the controversial Tropicália movement and sociopolitical turmoil in dictatorial Brazil, whose government was censoring and arresting the movement's more explicitly political artists. Veloso and Gil were jailed temporarily before going into exile in England, while Ben had some of his songs banned from radio play. At a music festival, Ben was heckled for his performance of "Charles Anjo 45", but the song entered the record charts and remained a staple of his repertoire. The album improved Ben's standing in Brazil's music community. As Jurek later wrote:

Jorge Ben was not well received in Veja, however. Reviewing for Brazil's leading news magazine in December 1969, music journalist Tárik de Souza argued that Ben had failed to project himself as a singer, composer, and guitarist. He largely faulted Philips for disregarding the rhythmic appeal of Ben's past success by hiring Bríamonte, whose excessive preoccupation with melody and harmony resulted in orchestrations that suffocate the songs, although Duprat's few arrangements were seen as "magnificent".

The album was reissued on CD in Brazil during the 1990s, but eventually went out of print. In 2008, Dusty Groove America released a remastered CD in the United States. A vinyl edition was issued for the first time in the U.S. in 2018, when Verve and Universal Music Enterprises remastered the album in anticipation of its 50th anniversary.

Track listing
All songs were written by Jorge Ben.

Personnel 
Credits are adapted from the album's liner notes.

Musicians
 Jorge Ben – guitar, vocals
 José Briamonte – arrangements (side one: tracks 1, 2, 3, 5; side two: tracks 1, 3, 4, 5, 6)
 Rogério Duprat – arrangements (side one: track 4; side two: track 2)
 Trio Mocotó – featured performance

Production
 Manoel Barenbein – production
 Stelio Carlini – engineering
 Ary Carvalhaes – engineering
 Didi – engineering
 João Kibelestis – engineering
 Célio Martins – engineering

Packaging
 Alberi – artwork
 Lincoln – layout
 Armando Pittigliani – liner notes
 Johnny Salles – photography

Charts

See also 

 Brazilian rock
 Culture of Brazil
 Psychedelic soul

References

Further reading 
  An essay on Jorge Ben and Fôrça Bruta.

External links 
 

Jorge Ben albums
1969 albums
Philips Records albums
Psychedelic music albums by Brazilian artists
Tropicália albums